Weekend with my Mother is a 2009 Romanian drama film directed by Stere Gulea.

Cast 
 Medeea Marinescu - Luiza
 Adela Popescu - Cristina
 Tudor Istodor - Glont
  - Sandu
  - Costica
 Gheorghe Dinică - Grandfather
 Andi Vasluianu - Johnny
 Ecaterina Nazare - Elena
 Nicoleta Costache Laura - Andreea
 Florin Zamfirescu - Felix
 Răzvan Vasilescu - Edwards

References

External links 

2009 drama films
2009 films
Romanian drama films
2000s Romanian-language films